The Sabine Baronetcy, of Ion House in the County of Bedford, was a title in the Baronetage of England.  It was created on 22 March 1671 for John Sabine.  The title became extinct on his death in 1704.

Sabine baronets, of Ion House (1671)
Sir John Sabine, 1st Baronet (–1704)

References

Extinct baronetcies in the Baronetage of England